Palaban is a Philippine television public affairs show broadcast by GMA Network. Hosted by Solita Monsod, Miriam Quiambao and Malou Mangahas, it premiered on November 8, 2006 replacing Debate with Mare at Pare. The show concluded on November 14, 2007. It was replaced by Born to Be Wild in its timeslot.

Accolades

References

2006 Philippine television series debuts
2007 Philippine television series endings
Filipino-language television shows
GMA Network original programming
GMA Integrated News and Public Affairs shows
Philippine television shows